Subbiah Muthiah,  (13 April 1930 – 20 April 2019), was an Indian writer, journalist, cartographer, amateur historian and heritage activist known for his writings on the political and cultural history of Chennai city. He was the founder of the fortnightly newspaper Madras Musings and the principal organizer of the annual Madras Day celebrations. Muthiah was also the founder-President of the Madras Book Club.

Early life and education 
Muthiah was born in Pallathur in the Ramnad district of Madras Presidency, British India in a Nagarathar family on 13 April 1930. Muthiah had his early schooling in Ladies' College, S. Thomas' Preparatory School and Royal College in Colombo and completed his matriculation in India in 1946 at Montfort European School, Yercaud. Between 1946 and 1951, Muthiah studied arts and engineering in the United States of America and returned to Ceylon after obtaining his master's degree in International Relations in 1951.

With The Times of Ceylon 

On his return to Ceylon, Muthiah took up a job with The Times of Ceylon and served the newspaper for 17 years eventually rising to the second position in the newspaper's hierarchy and heading the weekly Sunday edition. When the citizenship laws of the country were amended in 1968, Muthiah, who was not yet a citizen of Ceylon lost his job and had to move to India.

In India 

Muthiah settled down in the city of Madras and took up a job with T. T. K. Maps, a newly formed cartographic division of T. T. K. Healthcare Ltd where he was tasked with preparation of tourist guides and books on South India. In 1981, Muthiah wrote his first book Madras Discovered based on the research he had done to prepare tourist guides on Madras city. He followed it with two more books on Madras and one each on Parry's and Simpson's Ltd.

Post-retirement 

On his retirement from T. T. K. Maps in 1990, Muthiah took up writing full-time and founded the fortnightly newspaper Madras Musings. Muthiah also involved himself in heritage activism for Madras city and wrote regular columns for Indian newspapers most prominently The Hindu. In 1999, Muthiah co-founded Chennai Heritage, a foundation for heritage conservation in Chennai. Muthiah was also one of the brains behind the annual Madras Day celebrations held in Chennai city on the anniversary of the founding of the settlement of Fort St. George by Andrew Cogan and Francis Day on 22 August 1639.

In 2011, Muthiah published the book Madras Miscellany, a collection of articles from weekly columns of the same name that he had written for The Hindu since November 1999. Muthiah also volunteered to edit the gazetteer on Chennai that was commissioned by the British Council through the Association of British Scholars, India Chapter. Volume one of the 3-volume gazetteer titled Madras, Chennai: A 400 year record of the first city of Modern India on "The Land, People and Governance" and volume two on "Services, Education and the Economy" were published in 2008 and 2014 respectively and a third on "Information, Culture and Entertainment" was under preparation.

Honors 

On 7 March 2002, Muthiah was made an "Honorary Member of the Civil Division of the Most Excellent Order of the British Empire". The award was presented to him by Michael Herrige, British High Commissioner to India at a function in Chennai. The citation read that the award was presented for "service by those who are not British citizens but who have pursued ideals which Britain values and shares".

Personal life 

Muthiah's father, N. M. Subbiah Chettiar (1905–2002) was a stockbroker and politician who served as a mayor of Colombo, British Ceylon and was one of the founders of the Ceylon India Congress formed in 1939. He even stood for elections for the House of Representatives of Ceylon from the Nuwara Eliya constituency in 1947 and lost.

Muthiah married Valliammai Achi (1950–2013) in 1969. The couple had two daughters Ranjani and Parvathi. Valliammai worked as a Company Secretary till her death in 2013. Muthiah lived in Chennai where he spent most of his day on his desk. After spending the evening at the Madras Club, he used to retire to his home, where he had two glasses of Indian whisky before dinner.

Criticism 

At the inauguration of the 2009 edition of the Chennai Book Fair, M. Karunanidhi, Chief Minister of Tamil Nadu regretted the fact that Muthiah's book Madras Rediscovered did not make even a passing mention of the tenures of C. N. Annadurai or himself.

Works 

 
 
Muthiah, S. (1987). Madras discovered : a historical guide to looking around, supplemented with tales of "Once upon a city". Affiliated East-West Press.
 
 Muthiah, S. (1990). An atlas of India. OUP
 
 
Muthiah, S. (1990). Madras, its yesterdays, todays, and tomorrows. Association of British Council Scholars, South India.
 
 
 
 
 Muthiah, S. (1995). At home in Madras. Overseas Women’s Club.
 
 
 Muthiah, S.; Ramnarayan, V. (1998). All in the game, a pictorial history of the Madras Cricket Club. The Madras Cricket Club.
 Perera, S. S.; Muthiah, S. (1999).The Janashakthi book of Sri Lanka cricket, 1832-1996. Janashakthi Insurance.
 
 
 Muthiah, S. (2002). The ace of clubs, the story of the Madras Club. The Madras Club.
 Muthiah, S. (2002). B.S. Abdur Rahman – a visionary with a mission.
Muthiah, S.; Kalpana, K., Schiffer, Frank. (2003). Madras : the architectural heritage. Indian National Trust for Art and Cultural Heritage.
 Muthiah, S. (2004). 60 landmark years. L&T and ECC.
 
 
 Muthiah, S. (2004). The Indo Lankans, their 200-year saga. Indian Heritage Foundation.
 Muthiah, S. (2005). Madras that is Chennai, gateway to the South; Ranpar Publishers.
 Muthiah, S. (2006). 150 Years of excellence, a pictorial history of the University of Madras. University of Madras.
 Muthiah, S. (2006). The Chettiar heritage, The Chettiar Heritage.
 Muthiah, S. (2006). A tradition of Madras that is Chennai, the Taj Connemara. The Taj Connemara.
 Muthiah, S. (2006). A work of genius, the Senate House of the University of Madras. University of Madras
 Muthiah, S. (2007). Overcoming challenge: the 125 year saga of Chennai Port, the harbour that men made. Chennai Port Trust.
 
 
 Muthiah, S. (2008). Madras, Chennai: a 400 year record of the first city of modern India, Vols. 1, 2 and 3; Association of British Scholars; Vol. 1 came out in 2008 and Vol. 3 in 2019.
 Muthiah, S. (2009). The school in the Park, a hundred years of the Sacred Heart School.
 
 Muthiah, S. (2010). Down by the Adyar. Madras Boat Club.
 
 Muthiah, S. (2012). Walkabout in Oz. Ranpar Publishers.
 Muthiah, S. (2012). A Kodaikanal icon, the 125 year old history of a Kodi landmark (the story of the Kodaikanal Club). Ranpar Publishers.
 Muthiah, S.; Maclure, Harry. (2014) The Anglo Indians, a 500 year history. Niyogi Books.
 Muthiah, S.; Meyyappan Junior. (2014). A Chettiar album. The Chettiar Heritage.
 Muthiah, S. (2016). The Madras Musings silver jubilee book. Chennai Heritage.
 Muthiah, S. (2016). T.T. Vasu – The man who could never say no. Ranpar Publishers.
 Muthiah, S. (2016). Office chai, planter’s brew. Westland.
Muthiah, S. (2016). The magnificent Shevaroys. Ranpar Publishers.

References 

Indian male journalists
Sri Lankan Tamil journalists
Members of the Order of the British Empire
1930 births
2019 deaths
Alumni of Royal College, Colombo
Sri Lankan people of Indian descent
Alumni of S. Thomas' Preparatory School, Kollupitiya
20th-century Indian historians
People from Sivaganga district
Writers from Tamil Nadu
Indian Members of the Order of the British Empire